Emily Levesque (born 1984) is an American astronomer and assistant professor in the Department of Astronomy at the University of Washington. She is renowned for her work on massive stars and using these stars to investigate galaxy formation. In 2014, she received the Annie Jump Cannon Award for her innovative work on gamma ray bursts and the Sloan Fellowship in 2017. In 2015, Levesque, Rachel Bezanson, and Grant R. Tremblay published an influential paper,  which critiqued the use of the Physics GRE as an admissions cutoff criterion for astronomy postgraduate programs by showing there was no statistical correlation between applicant's score and later success in their academic careers. Subsequently, the American Astronomical Society adopted the stance that the Physics GRE should not be mandatory for graduate school applications, and many graduate astronomy programs have since removed the Physics GRE as a required part of their graduate school applications. She is also the author of the 2020 popular science book The Last Stargazers: The Enduring Story of Astronomy's Vanishing Explorers.

Early life and education
Levesque grew up in Taunton, Massachusetts. She received her undergraduate degree in physics at Massachusetts Institute of Technology in 2006, followed by a PhD in astronomy at the University of Hawaii in 2010.

Academic career 
From 2010 to 2015, Levesque was a postdoctoral researcher at University of Colorado as an Einstein Fellow from 2010 to 2013, and then received a Hubble Fellowship from 2013 to 2015. She has been an assistant professor in the Department of Astronomy at the University of Washington since 2015.

Levesque was awarded a Guggenheim Fellowship in April 2022.

Research 

Levesque uses both observations and modeling in her work. In the ultraviolet portion of the spectrum, she uses the Hubble Space Telescope to obtain spectra of star-forming galaxies. In the optical, she uses the Gemini and Keck observatories on Mauna Kea and the Las Campanas Observatories in Chile to study red supergiants in the Milky Way and in the Magellanic Clouds. She has discovered many new red supergiants, as well as the first candidate for a Thorne-Zytkow object (HV 2112).

Levesque and Jamie Lomax also sparked a jumping spider Twitter arachnoastronomy phenomenon with the help of Nathan Morehouse who studies spider eyesight at the University of Cincinnati.

Books

References

External links
 Emily Levesque's public talk in the Silicon Valley Astronomy Lecture Series

American women astronomers
American astrophysicists
University of Washington faculty
MIT Department of Physics alumni
University of Hawaiʻi at Mānoa alumni
Recipients of the Annie J. Cannon Award in Astronomy
Living people
Women astrophysicists
1984 births